The Racing Point RP19 is a Formula One racing car designed and developed by the Racing Point F1 Team, to compete in the 2019 Formula One World Championship. It is the first car built by Racing Point after their purchase of the Force India Formula One Team assets in August 2018. The RP19 was driven by Sergio Pérez and Lance Stroll and made its competitive debut at the 2019 Australian Grand Prix.

Complete Formula One results
(key)

 Driver failed to finish the race, but was classified as they had completed over 90% of the winner's race distance.

References

RP19
2019 Formula One season cars